Club Deportivo Laredo is a Spanish football team based in Laredo, in the autonomous community of Cantabria. Founded in 1927, it plays in Segunda División RFEF – Group 1, holding home matches at Campo de Fútbol San Lorenzo, which has a capacity of 2,500.

History
CD Laredo was founded in 1927 with the name of Sociedad Deportiva Charlestón. In 1932 the club won the Regional Final against Madrid of Santander (Racing reserve team) 4:1. That was a huge success in the beginning of its history. After the Spanish Civil War, due to a temporary law forbidding the use of foreign words in football club names, the team's official denomination changed to the current Club Deportivo Laredo.

In 1987, the club promoted for the first time to Segunda División B. Despite being immediately relegated, the club returned to the third tear just one year later, but it finished again in the relegation positions.

Since 1990, Laredo played uninterruptedly in Tercera División. In the 2018-19 season the club won silver medals by finishing just 6 points behind the champion UM Escobedo.

Season to season

3 seasons in Segunda División B
2 seasons in Segunda División RFEF
48 seasons in Tercera División

Current squad

Notable former players
 José Emilio Amavisca

References

External links
Official website 
Futbolme team profile 

Football clubs in Cantabria
Association football clubs established in 1927
1927 establishments in Spain